David Lees Kitson (13 September 1925 – 6 May 2002) was an English cricketer. He was a right-handed batsman who played 32 games scoring 882 runs for Somerset between 1952 and 1954. He was born in Batley, Yorkshire and died in Ilminster, Somerset.

Kitson was one of several Yorkshire League cricketers recruited by Somerset to bolster the county's fragile batting in the early 1950s, when the county finished bottom of the County Championship for four consecutive seasons. He played fairly regularly in 1953, when the county had temporarily dispensed with the services of Les Angell as Harold Gimblett's opening partner, and scored 589 runs in the season at an average of 17.84. His highest score was an innings of 69 against Leicestershire at Leicester in 1953. Angell returned to Somerset in 1954 and though Gimblett was unable to play, Kitson did not retain his place in the team and left the staff at the end of the season.

He remained in Somerset and later won some renown at bowls.

References

1925 births
2002 deaths
English cricketers
Somerset cricketers
Cricketers from Batley